The 1894 VMI Keydets football team represented the Virginia Military Institute (VMI) in their fourth season of organized football. The Keydets compiled a 6–0 record, the first undefeated season in team history.

Schedule

Roster

Ends

Guards

Tackles

Centers

Backs

Substitutes

References

VMI
VMI Keydets football seasons
College football undefeated seasons
VMI Keydets football